Béthune station is a railway station serving the town Béthune, Pas-de-Calais department, northern France. It is situated on the Arras–Dunkirk railway and the Fives–Abbeville railway. The station is served by high speed trains to Paris and Dunkerque, and by regional trains towards Lille, Arras, Saint-Pol-sur-Ternoise and Calais.

References

External links
 

Railway stations in Pas-de-Calais